Saphir Sliti Taïder (born 29 February 1992) is a professional footballer who plays as a central midfielder for the Algeria national team.

After beginning professionally with Grenoble in 2010, Taïder spent most of his career in Italy, representing Bologna (two spells), Internazionale and Sassuolo. Over six-and-a-half seasons, he made 172 appearances and scored 10 goals in Serie A.

Taïder represented his place of birth, France, in the youth international level. He made his senior debut for Algeria in 2013 and represented the nation at the 2014 FIFA World Cup and 2015 Africa Cup of Nations.

Club career

Grenoble 
Taïder made his professional debut with Grenoble on 15 May 2010 in a league match against Marseille. On 5 July 2010, he signed his first professional contract, agreeing to a three-year deal with Grenoble.

Bologna 
Following Grenoble's relegation to the Championnat de France amateur 2, the fifth division of French football, due to financial problems in 2011, Taïder joined Italian club Bologna. He made his Serie A debut on 11 December 2011 as a substitute. On 16 January 2012, he made his first start in Serie A in the 1–1 draw against Napoli. A day later, it was announced Taïder was signed by Juventus on a co-ownership deal for €2,425,000 in which Frederik Sørensen heading the other way for €2.5 million, effectively made Bologna acquired 50% registration rights of Sørensen for €75,000 in a cash plus player deal. Taïder remained on loan at Bologna for the rest of 2011–12 season. In June 2012, Bologna bought back Taïder for €2.35 million, while Sørensen returned to Juventus in June 2014.

Inter
On 20 August 2013, Taïder joined Internazionale on a four-year contract for a €5.5 million transfer fee, plus the loan of Diego Laxalt. Bologna also retained 50% registration as part of the co-ownership deal. He made his debut for the Nerazzurri six days later in a 2–0 home victory against Genoa, coming on as a substitute for Ricky Álvarez in the 85th minute. He played 25 times in 2013–14 Serie A for Inter, scoring once in a 7–0 win at Sassuolo on 22 September. On 4 December, in his only Coppa Italia match of the season, he scored a first-half penalty in a 3–2 home win over Serie B club Trapani in the tournament's fourth round.

In June 2014, the co-ownership deal of Taïder between Bologna and Inter was renewed. However, on 1 July, Inter purchased him outright for a €2 million fee, with former Bologna youth product Lorenzo Paramatti returning to his parent club for a €1 million fee.

On 6 August 2014, Taïder joined English Premier League side Southampton on a season-long loan, in exchange for Dani Osvaldo. He played his only match three days later, replacing James Ward-Prowse in the 61st minute of a 1–0 home friendly defeat to Bayer Leverkusen.

The loan was terminated on 1 September 2014 and he was immediately loaned to Serie A side Sassuolo, as Southampton said he "failed to live up to the high levels of commitment expected of Southampton players". He made his debut 13 days later, replacing Simone Missiroli at half-time as Sassuolo lost 7–0 to Inter at the San Siro.

Return to Bologna

On 31 August 2015, Bologna re-signed Taïder on a two-year loan, with an obligation to purchase him outright for an undisclosed fee. Inter also write-down the value of the contact of Taïder to €2.5 million backdated to 30 June 2015. At Bologna, he also joined fellow Inter teammate Lorenzo Crisetig, who was signed under the same loan plus obligation deal in July 2015. According to Bologna, the club acquired Taïder for a €2 million transfer fee plus an additional €500,000 as a loan fee for the 2016–17 season. Bologna acquired Taïder on loan for free in 2015–16 season.

Taïder played 29 and 24 times for Bologna in Serie A in 2015–16 and 2016–17 season respectively, scoring three goals.

Montreal Impact
On 22 January 2018, Taïder signed a three-year deal at Major League Soccer (MLS) club Montreal Impact, starting with a two-year loan and the option of a fourth year. He joined as a Designated Player. He made his debut on 7 March as the season began with a 2–1 loss at fellow Canadians Vancouver Whitecaps FC in what was also the first match for Impact manager Rémi Garde. A month later, he received a straight red card in the 14th minute of a 4–0 loss at the New England Revolution for a foul on Luis Caicedo. He scored his first goal for the Impact on 28 April, albeit in a 4–1 defeat away to Atlanta United FC.

On 21 November 2019, Montreal opted to make his move permanent.

Al-Ain
On 14 October 2020, signed with Al-Ain ahead of their inaugural season in the Saudi Professional League.

International career 
Taïder played for France at U18, U19 and U20 level. On 26 March 2013, Taïder scored on his debut for Algeria against Benin.

At the 2014 FIFA World Cup, Taïder played the entirety of Algeria's opening group match, a 2–1 defeat to Belgium. He did not feature again until the round of 16, playing the first 78 minutes of a loss to Germany by the same score after extra time in Porto Alegre.

Taïder was chosen in coach Christian Gourcuff's Algerian squad for the 2015 Africa Cup of Nations in Equatorial Guinea. He played every match as they were eliminated in the quarter-finals by eventual winners Ivory Coast.

Personal life 
Taïder was born in France to a Tunisian father and an Algerian mother. He is the younger brother of Tunisian international Nabil Taïder.

Career statistics

Club

International goals
Scores and results list Algeria's goal tally first, score column indicates score after each Taïder goal.

Honours
Montreal Impact
 Canadian Championship: 2019

References

External links

 
 
 
 
 AIC profile (data by football.it)  
 

1992 births
Living people
People from Castres
Sportspeople from Tarn (department)
French footballers
Algerian footballers
French sportspeople of Algerian descent
French sportspeople of Tunisian descent
Algerian people of Tunisian descent
Sportspeople of Tunisian descent
Association football midfielders
Algeria international footballers
France youth international footballers
2014 FIFA World Cup players
2015 Africa Cup of Nations players
Grenoble Foot 38 players
Bologna F.C. 1909 players
Inter Milan players
Southampton F.C. players
U.S. Sassuolo Calcio players
CF Montréal players
Al-Ain FC (Saudi Arabia) players
Ligue 1 players
Ligue 2 players
Serie A players
Major League Soccer players
Saudi Professional League players
Designated Players (MLS)
Algerian expatriate footballers
French expatriate footballers
Algerian expatriate sportspeople in Italy
French expatriate sportspeople in Italy
Expatriate footballers in Italy
Algerian expatriate sportspeople in England
French expatriate sportspeople in England
Expatriate footballers in England
Algerian expatriate sportspeople in Canada
French expatriate sportspeople in Canada
Expatriate soccer players in Canada
Algerian expatriate sportspeople in Saudi Arabia
French expatriate sportspeople in Saudi Arabia
Expatriate footballers in Saudi Arabia
Footballers from Occitania (administrative region)